The Alberg 37 is a Canadian sailboat that was designed by Carl Alberg as a racer-cruiser and first built in 1967.

Production
The design was built by Whitby Boat Works in Ajax, Ontario, Canada. The company built 248 examples of the design between 1967 and 1988. The Mark I was built from 1967 to 1971 and the Mark II from 1971 until production end in 1988.

Design

The Alberg 37 is a recreational keelboat, built predominantly of fibreglass, with teak wood trim. It has a masthead sloop rig or optional yawl rig, with aluminum spars. It has a slightly spooned raked stem, a raised counter transom, a keel-mounted rudder controlled by a wheel tiller and a fixed long keel. It displaces  and carries  of lead ballast.

Other engines that were factory-fitted include the  Volvo MD2B, the  Volvo MD11C and the Westerbeke 4-107.

The design has sleeping accommodation for seven people. There is a bow "V"-berth, a main cabin folding settee berth to starboard, a dinette table that can be folded to make room for a double berth and an aft pilot berth. The galley is to starboard at the foot to the companionway steps and, in fact, the steps conflict with the sink space, necessitating a folding ladder design. The gallery has a three-burner, alcohol-fired stove and oven. The head is located on the port side, just aft of the bow cabin and has a sliding privacy door. It includes a shower and a pressurized water supply.

Ventilation is provided by an opening bow cabin skylight. There is a bow anchor locker.

The cockpit seats are made from inlaid teak. The mainsail and jib halyards are provided with winches. There are also cockpit winches for the mainsheet and the genoa. The genoa has tracks, with cars and blocks.

A Mark II version was also built with less wood used, including a moulded floor support, moulded cabin headliner and a toerail made from fibreglass.

The design has a PHRF racing average handicap of 162 and a Portsmouth Yardstick of 83.0.

Operational history
Alberg 37s have made several circumnavigations of the globe, including one by Mike Phelps of Florida that took seven years to complete.

In a 1994 review Richard Sherwood wrote of the yawl version, "this yawl was derived from the Alberg 37 sloop and is available in that rig. Lines are classic, with a long counter, full keel, and spoon bow. Beam is moderate and the hull quite symmetrical."

In a 2002 review in Cruising World, Tom Zydler wrote, "the Alberg 37 has the feel of an oceangoing yacht with wide side decks leading to the bow. Below, you get the impression of a larger boat due to ambient light and breeze from several ports and two overhead hatches."

In a 2002 review for boats.com, Paul Howard described the design, "with long overhangs and a pleasing sheer, the 37 is an unmistakably classic design. Although first built as a racer/cruiser, the Alberg is now known as a traditional cruiser with medium-heavy displacement performance."

A review in Blue Water Boats described the design as "shapely" and noted that it was "originally designed as a racer cruiser, the Alberg 37 is better known today as a medium-heavy displacement bluewater capable cruiser. She's strong, seaworthy, and best of all very affordable."

See also

List of sailing boat types''

Similar sailboats
Baltic 37
C&C 37
C&C 110
CS 36
Dickerson 37
Dockrell 37
Endeavour 37
Express 37
Hunter 36-2
Marlow-Hunter 37
Nor'Sea 37
Tayana 37

References

External links

Keelboats
1960s sailboat type designs
Sailing yachts
Sailboat type designs by Carl Alberg
Sailboat types built by Whitby Boat Works